The third season of the Greek reality television show I Farma, based on the Swedish television series Farmen and returned after a sixteen-year hiatus in Greece, began airing on March 12, 2021 on ANT1.

Sakis Tanimanidis presented the show. Vassilis Filippou was the caretaker of the Farm.

Format
Fourteen contestants are chosen from the outside world, who declared participation. Each week one contestant is selected the Farmer of the Week, by a leadership race. In the first week, the first farmer to be participating in the race, was chosen by a game. Since week 2, the first farmer to be participating is chosen by the contestant evicted in the previous week. The second farmer to be participating in the race was chosen by the contestants.

Nomination process
The Farmer of the Week nominates two people (a man and a woman) as the Butlers. After some days, the Farmer of the Week must decide which Butler is the first to go to the Battle. That person then chooses the second person (from the same sex) for the Battle. They have to play 5 games, which each game has from 1 until 5 points. The farmer with the most points wins the Battle and the other farmer is evicted from the game.

Farmers
Ages stated are at time of contest.

Nominations

Notes

*On Week 7 it was announced that the most popular player of the players that have been evicted, will be returning to the game. Mixalis, who had lost a duel to Vasilis T. returned to the game.

*On week 7 Maria M. and Irini were the two duelers. Irini originally won the duel but Quit so that Maria M. could stay in the game.

The game

References

External links
 Official website

The Farm (franchise)
2021 Greek television seasons